The Ecuadorian Army is the land component of the Ecuadorian Armed Forces. Its 160,500 soldiers are deployed in relation to its military doctrine. The contemporary Ecuadorian Army incorporates many jungle and special forces infantry units into its structure.

Main objectives
To defend the national territory as part of a Joint Task Force.
To represent a strong military image as part of the Ecuadorian Armed Forces, national as well as international.
Take part in activities and support the development and co-operation in times of crisis.
Take part in Peacekeeping and international security operations.
To reach and maintain a high operational level within the Ground Forces.
To represent, implement an integrated institution, within the operational system.
To guarantee the disposition of prepared military personnel in order to accomplish all missions and assignments.
To dispose of an investigations and development element, with focus on national defense.
To correctly execute administration procedures involving all institutional issues.

Mission
To develop territorial-power, in order to accomplish institutional objectives, which guarantee the integrity and sovereignty of the national territory and contribute to the security and development of the nation, as well as to accomplish all objectives indicated by the military strategic planning.

Vision
To be an institution of the highest level and credibility, systematically integrated, with professional military personnel, orientated on ethics and moral. Capable of adapting itself to new requirements which guarantee peace, security and the nations development.

History
The Ecuadorian Armed Forces history could start as early as 1531, when civil war ravaged through the Inca Empire. In a key battle near Riobamba, where Huascar's troops were met and defeated by Atahualpa's troops. This did not save Atahualpa and his army from total defeat, only a year later at the Battle of Cajamarca against the Spanish conquerors. It would take almost 300 years when Ecuador's struggle for emancipation from the Spanish colonial rule would reach its peak at the Battle of Pichincha. Following a victory, Ecuadorian troops would become part of the Gran Colombian coalition. These were years in which warfare dominated. First, the country was in the front line of Gran Colombia's efforts to free Peru from Spanish rule between 1822 and 1825; then, in 1828 and 1829, the Ecuadorian troops would be in the middle of an armed struggle between Peru and Gran Colombia for the location of their common border. After the naval victory and the blockade of Guayaquil by the Peruvian army the land campaign became favorable to the great Colombians, the forces of Gran Colombia, under the leadership of Marechal Sucre and the Venezuelan general Juan José Flores, were victorious in the battle of the Portete de Tarqui but this result did not define the final result of the war. Months later, the Gran Colombia dissolves forever. By 1859 the nation was on the brink of anarchy. This led to a civil war and the first EEcuadorian–Peruvian War of 1857–1860. Backed by Guillermo Franco, an Ecuadorian General, the Peruvian army led by General Ramón Castilla arrived in Guayaquil and forcing Ecuador to sign the Mapasingue Treaty which declares the allocation of Peruvian lands null and forcing the suspension of the Ecuadorian-English business. Accusing Guillermo Franco of treason for signing a treaty with the Peruvians, Gabriel García Moreno, allied with former enemy General Juan José Flores, attacked Franco's forces. After several battles, García Moreno's forces were able to force Franco's troops to retreat back to Guayaquil, the site of the final battle. Ecuadorian troops would face their greatest challenge and defeat, when in 1941, under controversial circumstances, another Ecuadorian–Peruvian War erupted. A much larger and better equipped Peruvian force, quickly overwhelmed the Ecuadorian forces, driving them back from Zarumilla and invading the Ecuadorian province of El Oro. The government of Ecuador, saw itself forced to accept Peru's territorial claims. Subsequently Peruvian troops withdrew from the invaded El Oro province. However, occasional clashes kept occurring and flared into another outbreak of serious fighting in January 1981 called the Paquisha War, for the control of three watchposts set up by Ecuadorian troops inside a disputed border area. The conflict ceased with the control of the Peruvian army of the disputed area evicting the Ecuadorian troops.. In 1998 the Brasilia Act is signed where Perú is granted the disputed territory (Tiwinza).

Structure
Already back in 1989 the Army was with around 40.000 troops nearly four times the combined strength of the Navy and air force. In 2003, it was structured into four independent Army Divisions operating around 25 Infantry Battalions. These battalions were implemented in Brigades which were not numbered consecutively but carried odd numbers in the series 1 to 27. All Brigades had also a Special Forces and engineer, or at least a communications and Logistic Support Company.  As of 2008, along with the Air Force and Navy, the Army (also referred to as Land Forces) is undergoing a reform in order to maximize is joint capability. This process involves the creation of U.S. like Operational Commands. There are 4 Operational Joint Commands to be geographically distributed.

Leadership
The General of the Army is the highest rank of the Ecuadorian Army. Usually the Chief of Staff of the Army is also the General of the Army, and it is common for this general to hold the Chief of the Joint Staff position as well.

"PATRIA I"
Since 2009 a restructurization within the Ecuadorian Armed Forces has been launched under the name of "PATRIA I". It shall be completed by 2011 and improve military structure, equipment and operations within the Ecuadorian territory. Changes concerning structure and troop-deployment as of 2010 are not available due to the fact that the Ecuadorian Armed Forces keep such information restricted.

Specialties
Speciality badges mirror the US practice.

Infantry (Badge: Crossed Mauser 1895 rifles)
Armoured cavalry (Badge: M4 Sherman with crossed lances)
Artillery (Badge: Crossed Spanish era cannons)
Engineer Corp (Badge: Castle)
Signals (Badge: Crossed signal flags and a torch)
Army aviation (Badge: Wing and propeller)
Logistics (Badge: Sword and leaf)
Special Forces
Transportation (Badge: Wheel)
 Ordnance (Badge: Grenade)

Special forces
The Military Intelligence remains until today the greater unit of the Intelligence Weapon of the Terrestrial Forces.
The 9th Special Forces Brigade PATRIA, consists of paratroopers, specialized as Commandos, Operational Free Jumpers, Mountain Warfare, Frogmen, Snipers and Dog guides.
The Commando Special Forces School, the GEK-9 is an independent operating body transforming soldiers into future Commandos.
The Counter-terror unit "GEO", formed in 1985, it was trained by the US Navy Seals and the British SAS and maintains the highest standards.
The 17th, 19th and 21st Jungle Brigades, trained and experienced in jungle warfare.
The Jungle Warfare Special Operations Iwia Battalion No. 60, recruited from local warrior tribes like the Shuar, Záparo, Kichwa and Achuar.
The Jungle Warfare and Counter-insurgency Iwia School is at Coca in the Oriente.
Three Battalions with a strength of 550 men, equipped with forty Vector and Phantom tactical speed-patrol boats. These undergo a three-week training in the Special Forces center in Coca. In addition the United States provide training and assistance.

Army aviation
The aviation element of the Army was formed in 1954 originally named . It was renamed  in 1978. From 1981 onward the flying elements were concentrated into an aviation-brigade, effectively transforming the army-aviation into an operational brigade within the army-structure. Honouring the army-aviation's role in the Paquisha War in 1981, the unit was renamed  on July 1, 1987. Finally, in 1996 the BAE gained the status of a full arm within the army recognising its vital role in the Cenepa War of 1995. At present the BAE No.15 consists of:

Organization
As of November 2004, the Ecuadorian Land Forces Order of Battle was: 

 I Army Division "Shyris" (HQ Quito)
1st Armored Cavalry Brigade "Galápagos"
Presidential Horse Guards Squadron "Tarqui Grenadiers"
 4th Armored Cavalry Group 
 6th Mechanized Cavalry Group
 12th Mechanized Cavalry Group 
 16th Mechanized Cavalry Group
 28th Armored Cavalry Group 
 36th Mechanized Cavalry Group
Horseback-riding school
13th Infantry Brigade "Pichincha"
9th Special Forces Brigade "Patria"
24th Special Forces Group "Rayo"
25th Special Forces Group "Santo Domingo de los Colorados"
26th Special Forces Group "Quevedo"
27th Special Forces Group "Latacunga"
II Army Division "Libertad" (HQ Guayaquil)
5th Infantry Brigade "Guayas"
III Army Division "Tarqui" (HQ Cuenca)
1st Infantry Brigade "El Oro"
3rd Infantry Brigade
7th Infantry Brigade "Loja"
27th Artillery Brigade "Bolívar"
IV Army Division "Amazonas" (HQ El Coca)
17th Jungle Infantry Brigade "Pastaza"
17th Special Forces Company
49th Jungle Infantry Battalion
50th Jungle Infantry Battalion
51st Jungle Infantry Battalion
19th Jungle Infantry Brigade "Napo"
19th Special Forces Company "Aguarico"
55th Jungle Infantry Battalion "Putumayo"
56th Jungle Infantry Battalion "Tungurahua"
57th Jungle Infantry Battalion "Montecristi"
21st Jungle Infantry Brigade "Cóndor" (HQ Patuca)
60th Special Forces Battalion "Capitán Calles"
61st Jungle Infantry Battalion "Santiago"
62nd Jungle Infantry Battalion "Zamora"
63rd Jungle Infantry Battalion "Gualaquiza"
Independent Units
 1st Foot Guards (Honor Guard) Battalion "Libertadores" (HQ Quito)
23rd Engineers Command "Cenepa" (HQ Quito)
25th Logistics Support Brigade "Reino de Quito" (HQ Quito)

Equipment

Historically, the Army depended on a wide variety of foreign suppliers for virtually all of its equipment needs. Only in the 1980s did it begin to develop a modest domestic arms industry as the Directorate of Army Industries manufactured rifle ammunition, uniforms, boots, and other consumable items. The Army's present day equipment is mostly of western origins.

Equipment gallery

See also
 Military of Ecuador
 Venezuelan Army
 Colombian Army
 Peruvian Army

References

External links
Official site
SAORBATS Order of Battle & Equipment of South American Armed Forces.
Aeroflight Ecuador Army Aviation

Armies by country
Army